The following outline is provided as an overview of and topical guide to Myanmar:

Myanmar, also known as Burma, is the most extensive country in mainland Southeast Asia. The country is bordered by the People's Republic of China on the northeast, Laos on the east, Thailand on the southeast, Bangladesh on the west, and India on the northwest, with the Bay of Bengal to the southwest. One-third of Burma's total perimeter, 1,930 kilometers (1,199 mi), forms an uninterrupted coastline. The country's culture, heavily influenced by neighbours, is based on Theravada Buddhism intertwined with local elements.

General reference
 Pronunciation:  or 
 Common English country names: Myanmar or Burma
 Official English country name:  The Republic of the Union of Myanmar
 Common endonym(s):  
 Official endonym(s):  
 Adjectival(s): Burmese or Myanma
 Demonym(s):
 Etymology: Name of Myanmar
 International rankings of Myanmar
 ISO country codes: MM, MMR, 104
 ISO region codes: See ISO 3166-2:MM
 Internet country code top-level domain: .mm

Geography of Myanmar 

Geography of Myanmar
 Myanmar is: a country
 Location:
 Northern Hemisphere and Eastern Hemisphere
 Eurasia
 Asia
 South East Asia
 Indochina
 Time zone:  Myanmar Standard Time (UTC+06:30)
 Extreme points of Myanmar 
 High:  Hkakabo Razi 
 Low:  Indian Ocean 0 m
 North:  Hkakabo Razi 28°19′59″N
 South:  Islands at Kawthaung 9°50′00″N
 East:   Somewhere in Shan State Special region 4 but not in Mong La Township 101°10'10.2"E 
 West:   Northwest of Sittwe 92°10′00″E
 Land boundaries:  
 
 
 
 
 
 Coastline:  Indian Ocean 
 Population of Myanmar: 55,390,000 (2006) – 24th most populous country

 Area of Myanmar:  – 40th largest country
 Atlas of Myanmar

Environment of Myanmar 

 Climate of Myanmar
 Ecoregions in Myanmar
 Protected areas of Myanmar
 National parks of Myanmar
 Wildlife of Myanmar
 Fauna of Myanmar
 Birds of Myanmar
 Mammals of Myanmar

Natural geographic features of Myanmar 

 Islands of Myanmar
 Mountains of Myanmar
 Volcanoes in Myanmar
 Rivers of Myanmar
 World Heritage Sites in Myanmar: None

Regions of Myanmar

Ecoregions of Myanmar 

Ecoregions in Myanmar

Administrative divisions of Myanmar 

Administrative divisions of Myanmar

States 
 Chin State
 Kachin State
 Kayah State
 Kayin State
 Mon State
 Rakhine State
 Shan State

Regions 
 Ayeyarwady Region
 Bago Region
 Magway Region
 Mandalay Region
 Sagaing Region
 Tanintharyi Region
 Yangon Region

Self-Administered Zones 
 Danu Self-Administered Zone
 Kokang Self-Administered Zone
 Naga Self-Administered Zone
 Pa Laung Self-Administered Zone
 Pa-O Self-Administered Zone

Self-Administered Divisions 

 Wa Self-Administered Division

Districts of Myanmar 

Districts of Myanmar

Municipalities of Myanmar 

 Capital of Myanmar: Naypyidaw
 Cities of Myanmar

Demography of Myanmar 

Demographics of Myanmar

Government and politics of Myanmar 

Politics of Myanmar
 Form of government: unitary parliamentary republic
 Capital of Myanmar: Naypyidaw
 Elections in Myanmar
 Political parties in Myanmar

Branches of government

Government of Myanmar

Executive branch of the government of Myanmar 

 Head of state: Acting President of Myanmar, Myint Swe
 Vice Presidents: Myint Swe, Henry Van Thio
 Head of government: Prime Minister of Myanmar, Min Aung Hlaing
 Deputy Prime Minister: Soe Win
 Military junta: State Administration Council
 Chairman: Min Aung Hlaing
 Vice Chairman: Soe Win
 National Defence and Security Council
 Cabinet of Myanmar
Provisional Government

Legislative branch of the government of Myanmar 

 Assembly of the Union (Pyidaungsu Hluttaw)
 House of Representatives (Pyithu Hluttaw)
 House of Nationalities (Amyotha Hluttaw)
 State and Region Hluttaws

Judicial branch of the government of Myanmar 

Court system of Myanmar
 Supreme Court of Myanmar

Foreign relations of Myanmar 

Foreign relations of Myanmar
 Diplomatic missions in Myanmar
 Diplomatic missions of Myanmar

International organization membership 
The Union of Myanmar is a member of:

Asian Development Bank (ADB)
Asia-Pacific Telecommunity (APT)
Association of Southeast Asian Nations (ASEAN)
Association of Southeast Asian Nations Regional Forum (ARF)
Bay of Bengal Initiative for Multi-Sectoral Technical and Economic Cooperation (BIMSTEC)
Colombo Plan (CP)
East Asia Summit (EAS)
Food and Agriculture Organization (FAO)
Group of 77 (G77)
International Atomic Energy Agency (IAEA)
International Bank for Reconstruction and Development (IBRD)
International Civil Aviation Organization (ICAO)
International Criminal Police Organization (Interpol)
International Development Association (IDA)
International Federation of Red Cross and Red Crescent Societies (IFRCS)
International Finance Corporation (IFC)
International Fund for Agricultural Development (IFAD)
International Hydrographic Organization (IHO)
International Labour Organization (ILO)
International Maritime Organization (IMO)

International Monetary Fund (IMF)
International Olympic Committee (IOC)
International Organization for Standardization (ISO) (correspondent)
International Red Cross and Red Crescent Movement (ICRM)
International Telecommunication Union (ITU)
Nonaligned Movement (NAM)
Organisation for the Prohibition of Chemical Weapons (OPCW) (signatory)
South Asian Association for Regional Cooperation (SAARC) (observer)
United Nations (UN)
United Nations Conference on Trade and Development (UNCTAD)
United Nations Educational, Scientific, and Cultural Organization (UNESCO)
United Nations Industrial Development Organization (UNIDO)
Universal Postal Union (UPU)
World Customs Organization (WCO)
World Federation of Trade Unions (WFTU)
World Health Organization (WHO)
World Intellectual Property Organization (WIPO)
World Meteorological Organization (WMO)
World Trade Organization (WTO)

Burma is 1 of only 7 U.N. members which is not a member of the Organisation for the Prohibition of Chemical Weapons.

Law and order in Myanmar 

Law of Myanmar
 Constitution of Myanmar
 Crime in Myanmar
 Human rights in Myanmar
 LGBT rights in Myanmar
 Freedom of religion in Myanmar
 Law enforcement in Myanmar

Military of Myanmar 

Military of Myanmar
 Command
Commander-in-chief: Min Aung Hlaing
 Forces
 Army of Myanmar
 Navy of Myanmar
 Air Force of Myanmar
 Special Forces of Myanmar
 Military history of Myanmar
 Military ranks of Myanmar

Local government in Myanmar 

See: Administrative divisions of Myanmar, State and Region Government of Myanmar

History of Myanmar 

History of Myanmar
 Timeline of Burmese history
 Prehistory of Myanmar
 Military history of Myanmar

Culture of Myanmar 

Culture of Myanmar
 Architecture of Myanmar
 Cuisine of Myanmar
 Languages of Myanmar
 Media in Myanmar
 Museums in Myanmar
 Museums in Yangon
 National symbols of Myanmar
 Coat of arms of Myanmar
 Flag of Myanmar
 National anthem of Myanmar
 People of Myanmar
 Prostitution in Myanmar
 Public holidays in Myanmar
 Religion in Myanmar
 Buddhism in Myanmar
 Christianity in Myanmar
 Hinduism in Myanmar
 Islam in Myanmar
 Judaism in Myanmar
 World Heritage Sites in Myanmar: None

Art in Myanmar 
 Cinema of Myanmar
 Literature of Myanmar
 Music of Myanmar
 Television in Myanmar

Sports in Myanmar 

Sports in Myanmar
 Football in Myanmar
 Myanmar at the Olympics

Economy and infrastructure of Myanmar

Economy of Myanmar
 Economic rank, by nominal GDP (2007): 103rd (one hundred and third)
 Agriculture in Myanmar
 Communications in Myanmar
 Internet in Myanmar
 Companies of Myanmar
Currency of Myanmar: Kyat
ISO 4217: MMK
 Energy in Myanmar
 Health care in Myanmar
 Myanmar units of measurement
 Tourism in Myanmar
 Transport in Myanmar
 Airports in Myanmar
 Rail transport in Myanmar

Education in Myanmar 

Education in Myanmar

Health in Myanmar 

Health in Myanmar

See also 

List of international rankings
Member state of the United Nations
Outline of Asia
Outline of geography

References

External links

Government
 Republic of the Union of Myanmar – President's Office
 Chief of State and Cabinet Members from the Central Intelligence Agency (CIA)
General information
 General information about Myanmar
 Burma Myanmar search Engine
 Burma. The World Factbook. Central Intelligence Agency.
 Burma from UCB Libraries GovPubs
 
 Burma profile from the BBC News
 Myanmar at Encyclopædia Britannica
 
 
 Interactive timeline of turning points in Burmese history
 Key Development Forecasts for Myanmar from International Futures
 Online Burma/Myanmar Library: Classified and annotated links to more than 17,000 full-text documents on Burma/Myanmar
Economy
 Taipei American Chamber of Commerce; Topics Magazine, Analysis, November 2012.  Myanmar: Southeast Asia's Last Frontier for Investment, By David DuByne
Agriculture
 Myanmar Business Today; Print Edition, 27 February 2014.  A Roadmap to Building Myanmar into the Food Basket of Asia, by David DuByne & Hishamuddin Koh
 Myanmar Business Today; Print Edition, 19 June 2014.  Myanmar's Institutional Infrastructure Constraints and How to Fill the Gaps, by David DuByne & Hishamuddin Koh
Trade
 World Bank Summary Trade Statistics Myanmar
Environment
 Myanmar Marine Biodiversity Atlas Online from the Wildlife Conservation Society and University of Exeter

Myanmar